Sepidareh (also Romanized as Sepīdāreh; also known as Safid Dareh and Sefīdāreh) is a village in Nameh Shir Rural District, Namshir District, Baneh County, Kurdistan Province, Iran. At the 2006 census, its population was 273, in 41 families. The village is populated by Kurds.

References 

Towns and villages in Baneh County
Kurdish settlements in Kurdistan Province